This is a list of notable pornographic actors listed by the decade in which they made their debut.

This listing is subordered alphabetically by first name.

1950s

Female

1960s

Female

Male

1970s

Female

Male

1980s

Female

Male

1990s

Female

Male

2000s

Female

Male

2010s

Female

Male

2020s

Female

See also
List of glamour models

References 

Decade
Performers by decade
Pornographic